Satine may refer to:

 Satine Phoenix, Filipino American comic book illustrator, model, and actress
 Elena Satine, American actress
 Satine Kryze, a Star Wars character
 Satine, a character from the film Moulin Rouge!
 Satine, an organic milk brand by Yili Group